Peter Farrar (6 May 1897 – 1972) was an English footballer who played for Rochdale when they joined the English Football League in 1921.

References

1897 births
1972 deaths
English footballers
Everton F.C. players
Footballers from St Helens, Merseyside
Prescot Cables F.C. players
Rochdale A.F.C. players
St Helens Town A.F.C. players
Association footballers not categorized by position